Gloucester was, from 1894 to 1974,  a rural district in the administrative county of Gloucestershire, England. The district did not include the City of Gloucester, which was a separate county borough. In 1935 Gloucester RD was more than double in size.

Formation
The rural district was created by the Local Government Act 1894 as successor to Gloucester Rural Sanitary District. The rural district was governed by a directly elected rural district council (RDC), which replaced the rural sanitary authority that had comprised the poor law guardians for the area.

Boundary changes
Under the Local Government Act 1929 county councils were given the duty of reviewing all urban and rural districts within their area. In Gloucestershire there were a number of very small districts, and under the County of Gloucester Review Order 1935, Gloucester RD was enlarged by the transfer of the whole or parts of five abolished districts.

Between 1951 and 1967 a number of areas suburban to Gloucester were removed from the rural district when the city boundaries were extended.

Parishes
The district comprised the following civil parishes:

Abolition
The rural district was abolished on 1 April 1974 under the Local Government Act 1972. Its territory was split between three new non-metropolitan districts:  Tewkesbury (17 parishes), Stroud (16 parishes) and Forest of Dean (Newnham and Westbury-on-Severn parishes).

References

Districts of England created by the Local Government Act 1894
Districts of England abolished by the Local Government Act 1972
History of Gloucestershire
Rural districts of England